Peter T. Cummings is an Australian-American chemical engineer, currently the John R. Hall Professor of Chemical Engineering and Associate Dean For Research for the School of Engineering at Vanderbilt University. He formerly held positions at the University of Virginia and the University of Tennessee, Knoxville.

Between 1994–2013, Cummings was associated with the Oak Ridge National Laboratory (ORNL). He was one of the four researchers who wrote the proposal to establish ORNL's Center for Nanophase Materials Sciences Division (CNMS). From 2007 to 2013, he served as the Principal Scientist for the CNMS.

His research interests include statistical mechanics, computational materials engineering, and theoretical nanoscience using molecular modeling techniques such as molecular dynamics and Monte Carlo simulations.

References

1954 births
Living people
University of Melbourne alumni
University of Newcastle (Australia) alumni
Australian chemical engineers
American chemical engineers
Vanderbilt University faculty
Chemical engineering academics
Fellows of the American Physical Society